Erich Bautz (26 May 1913 – 17 September 1986) was a German racing cyclist, who won two stages in the 1937 Tour de France, and as a result wore the yellow jersey for three days.

He won the German National Road Race in 1937, 1941 and 1950.

Major results

1933
Rund um Köln
1936
Rund um Köln
Saarbrucken Rundfahrt
1937
 Germany national road race champion
Winner 8th stage Deutschland Tour
Winner 4th stage Tour de Luxembourg
1937 Tour de France:
Winner stage 4
Winner stage 17A
1938
Winner 5th and 13th stage Deutschland Tour
1939
Winner 3rd stage Deutschland Tour
1941
 Germany national road race champion
Winner 1st stage Echarpe d'Or
1947
Winner overall classification and two stage Deutschland Tour
1948
Winner two stages Deutschland Tour
1950
 national road race champion

References

External links

1913 births
1986 deaths
German male cyclists
German Tour de France stage winners
Cyclists from Dortmund
German cycling road race champions
20th-century German people